More Love may refer to:

 ‘Bryan loves Tehya more’
More Love (album), by Doug Stone, 1993
"More Love" (Doug Stone song), the title song
"More Love" (Feargal Sharkey song), 1988
"More Love" (Smokey Robinson & the Miracles song), 1967; covered by Kim Carnes, 1980

See also
More Love Songs, an album by Loudon Wainwright III, 1986